The 2003 season was Santos Futebol Clube's ninety-first season in existence and the club's fifty consecutive season in the top flight of Brazilian football.

Players

Squad information

Source:

Appearances and goals

Source: Match reports in Competitive matches

In

Out

Friendlies

Source:

Competitions

Overall summary

Detailed overall summary

Campeonato Brasileiro

League table

Results summary

Results by round

Matches

Copa Libertadores

Group stage

Knockout stage

Round of 16

Quarter-finals

Semi-finals

Finals

Campeonato Paulista

Results summary

Group stage

Copa Sul-Americana

Brazil 1 Preliminary

Final Brazil preliminary

Quarter-finals

References

External links
Official Site 

2003
Brazilian football clubs 2003 season